Luhrmann is a surname. Notable people with the surname include:
Baz Luhrmann (born 1962), Australian writer, director, and producer
Tanya Luhrmann (born 1959), often cited as T.M. Luhrmann, American psychological anthropologist

See also
 Anna Lührmann (born 1983), German politician